Another Year is the third album by English singer-songwriter Leo Sayer, which was released in 1975.

Track listing
All songs written by Leo Sayer and Frank Farrell.

Side one
"Bedsitterland" – 4:07
"Unlucky in Love" – 3:27
"The Last Gig of Johnny B Goode" – 3:49
"On the Old Dirt Road" – 4:01
"I Will Not Stop Fighting" – 5:00

Side two
"Moonlighting" – 4:13
"The Streets of Your Town" – 3:02
"The Kid's Grown Up" – 2:52
"Only Dreaming" – 5:15
"Another Year" – 3:13

Personnel
Leo Sayer – guitar, harmonica, vocals
Russ Ballard – piano, organ, marimba
Frank Farrell – piano, accordion
Leon Russell - slide guitar, vocals
Michael Giles – drums
David Katz Orchestra – violin, orchestra
Pip Williams - orchestration 
Paul Keogh – guitar
Dave Markee – bass guitar
Nick Newell – flute
Terry Starr – trumpet
Johnny Van Derek – violin

Technical
Louis Austin, Paul "Chas" Watkins - engineer
Terry O'Neill - photography

Production
Record producer: Russ Ballard, Adam Faith

Charts

References

External links
 

1975 albums
Albums produced by Russ Ballard
Chrysalis Records albums
Leo Sayer albums
Warner Records albums